Zbigniew Głowaty (4 March 1932 – 20 June 2014) was a Polish cyclist. He won the Rás Tailteann in 1963.

Early life
Głowaty was born in Galicia in 1932.

Career
Głowaty won the Polish Championship in track cycling in 1956. He won stages of the Tour de Pologne, finishing fourth overall in 1957. In 1963 he won the Rás Tailteann, the first foreigner to win Ireland's premier race.

Later life
Głowaty died in 2014 and was buried in Brzeg.

References

Polish male cyclists
1932 births
2014 deaths
Rás Tailteann winners
People from Ternopil Oblast